Stenjevac is a village situated in Despotovac municipality in Serbia (Europe).

Populated places in Pomoravlje District